Tianjia'an is a district of the city of Huainan, Anhui Province, China known for several places including Longhu Park, Shungeng Mountain, Commerce And Culture Square.

Administrative divisions
In the present, Tianjia'an District has 9 subdistricts.
9 Subdistricts

References

Huainan